In Japanese, Kayabuki may refer to:
 Kayabuki, a style of thatched roof house in Japan; see Iya Valley
 Yoko Kayabuki, a character from the Ghost in the Shell media franchise

See also
 Kayabukiya Tavern, a traditional-style Japanese "sake-house" restaurant in Utsunomiya, Japan